The paradas method (sistema de paradas) was a process to extract nitrate from caliche by leaching. In this method caliche was boiled in water in large pans called "paradas". It was a firewood and labour-intensive process. The paradas method was phased out in the 1850s by a new system invented by Pedro Gamboni which required less fuel and labour.

The paradas method led to a massive deforestation of Pampa del Tamarugal around La Tirana and Canchones and some areas to the south of these localities.

References

Economic history of Bolivia
Economic history of Chile
History of mining in Chile
Economic history of Peru
Mineral processing